An exequatur (Latin, literally "let it execute") is a legal document issued by a sovereign authority that permits the exercise or enforcement of a right within the jurisdiction of the authority.

International relations
An exequatur is a patent which a head of state issues to a foreign consul, guaranteeing the consul's rights and privileges of office and ensuring recognition in the state to which the consul is appointed to exercise such powers. If a consul is not appointed by commission, the consul receives no exequatur; the government will usually provide some other means to recognize the consul. An exequatur may be withdrawn, which necessitates a consul's recall.

Catholic Canon Law

An exequatur is a legal instrument issued by secular authorities in Roman Catholic nations to guarantee the legal force of papal decrees within the jurisdiction of the secular authority. This custom began during the Western Schism, when the legitimately elected Supreme Pontiff permitted secular leaders to verify the authenticity of papal decrees before enforcing them.

Some dissidents in the church claim that the custom arose as an implication of the nature of secular authority over the church, and that such a state privilege to verify papal doctrine had been exercised since the early days of the church. However, church doctrine denies that any permission from secular authority is necessary for papal decrees to be legally effective, even though secular authorities sometimes do not enforce them.

Other uses
In Brazilian, Romanian, French, Luxembourgian, Italian (via the Court of Appeal), Mexican, and Spanish laws, an exequatur is a judgment of a tribunal that a decision issued by a foreign tribunal is to be executed in the jurisdiction of the former, thereby granting authority to the decision of the foreign tribunal as if it issued from the native tribunal.

In Puerto Rico, an exequatur is a document that validates a court order of a United States civil court as if a court of the Commonwealth of Puerto Rico issued it.

References

Diplomatic documents
Canon law history
Jurisprudence of Catholic canon law
Latin legal terminology